Data matrix may refer to:

Matrix (mathematics), rectangular array of elements 
Data Matrix, a two-dimensional barcode
Data matrix (multivariate statistics), mathematical matrix of data whose rows represent different repetition of an experiment, and whose columns represent different kinds of datum taken for each repetition
Data set, collection of data in tabular form